Khomutov is the name of a Russian noble family of Scottish origin. According to the family's genealogy they are descended from Thomas Hamilton, who first entered the service to the Polish–Lithuanian Commonwealth and later became a soldier in Russia. He had a son named Petr (David) Homutov.

Notable members 
Mikhail Khomutov (1795—1864) was a general of cavalry, adjutant general and an earl (Hаказной атаман) of the Don Cossacks in 1848–1862.
 (1787, Moscow – 1858, Saint Petersburg), Russian writer, sister of Michail G. Khomutov. Cousin of Ivan Kozlov.

References

Russian noble families
Russian families of Scottish origin